Bagham may refer to:
Bagham, Iran
Bagham, Kent, United Kingdom

See also
Baghamari, a village in Odisha, India